Omapatrilat (INN, proposed trade name Vanlev) is an experimental antihypertensive agent that was never marketed.  It inhibits both neprilysin (neutral endopeptidase, NEP) and angiotensin-converting enzyme (ACE). NEP inhibition results in elevated natriuretic peptide levels, promoting natriuresis, diuresis, vasodilation, and reductions in preload and ventricular remodeling.

It was discovered and developed by Bristol-Myers Squibb but failed in clinical trials as a potential treatment for congestive heart failure due to safety concerns about its causing angioedema.

Omapatrilat angioedema was attributed to its dual mechanism of action, inhibiting both angiotensin-converting enzyme (ACE), and neprilysin (neutral endopeptidase), both of these enzymes are responsible for the metabolism of bradykinin which causes vasodilation, angioedema, and airway obstruction.

See also 
 Gemopatrilat
 Cilazapril
 Sacubitril

References

Further reading 

 

ACE inhibitors
Heterocyclic compounds with 2 rings
Carboxylic acids
Lactams
Propionamides
Thiols
Nitrogen heterocycles
Sulfur heterocycles
Abandoned drugs